Thomas Graal's Ward (Swedish: Thomas Graals myndling) is a 1922 Swedish silent drama film directed by Gustaf Molander and starring Einar Axelsson, Vera Schmiterlöw and Nils Aréhn.

Cast
 Einar Axelsson as 	Paul
 Vera Schmiterlöw as 	Babette
 Nils Aréhn as 	Thomas Graal
 Carl Browallius as 	Elias Jesperson
 Olof Molander as 	Baron Zoll
 Torsten Winge as Student
 Harry Roeck Hansen as 	Student
 Semmy Friedmann as Student
 Eugen Nilsson as 	Head Waiter
 Georg Blomstedt as 	Policeman
 Josua Bengtson as 	Conductor
 Gull Natorp as Lady with Piano
 Georg Fernqvist as Servant
 Ragnar Arvedson as 	Restaurant Guest
 Tekla Sjöblom as 	Landlady
 Waldemar Wohlström as 	Landlady's Husband
 Hilda Castegren as 	Woman with a Sheep
 Gösta Alexandersson as 	Rowdy Boy
 Edvin Adolphson as 	Restaurant Guest
 John Westin as 	Restaurant Guest

References

Bibliography
 Gustafsson, Tommy. Masculinity in the Golden Age of Swedish Cinema: A Cultural Analysis of 1920s Films. McFarland, 2014.
 Qvist, Per Olov & von Bagh, Peter. Guide to the Cinema of Sweden and Finland. Greenwood Publishing Group, 2000.

External links

1922 films
1922 drama films
Swedish drama films
Swedish silent feature films
Swedish black-and-white films
Films directed by Gustaf Molander
1920s Swedish-language films
Silent drama films
1920s Swedish films